Sakar Khan mausoleum located in Halol, Gujarat, is a dargah or mausoleum of Sakar Khan. It is the largest in the old part of Champaner. Dargah has a low plinth and a large dome, with windows in the frontage.

See also 

 List of Monuments of National Importance in Gujarat
 Champaner-Pavagadh Archaeological Park
 Monuments of Champaner-Pavagadh Archaeological Park

References  

 
Tourist attractions in Gujarat
Mausoleums in Gujarat